Eugenia bojeri is a species of plant in the family Myrtaceae. It is endemic to Mauritius.

References

bojeri
Endemic flora of Mauritius
Critically endangered plants
Taxonomy articles created by Polbot